Marcel François Paul Landowski (18 February 1915 – 23 December 1999) was a French composer, biographer and arts administrator.

Biography
Born at Pont-l'Abbé, Finistère, Brittany, he was the son of French sculptor Paul Landowski and great-grandson of the composer Henri Vieuxtemps. He was father of a son and two daughters. The younger, Manon Landowski is singer-songwriter, performer, author and composer of musical shows.

As an infant he showed early musical promise, and studied piano under Marguerite Long. He entered the Paris Conservatoire in 1935; in addition one of his teachers was Pierre Monteux.

Administrative career
In 1966, France's Cultural Affairs minister André Malraux appointed Landowski as the ministry's director of music, a controversial appointment made in the teeth of opposition from the then ascendant modernists, led by Pierre Boulez.

One of his first acts was the establishment, in 1967, of the Orchestre de Paris, appointing Charles Munch as its first director. He also championed the establishment of regional orchestras at a time when interest in them appeared to be waning. This was part of a so-called "ten-year plan for music", instituted with the intention of establishing an opera company and conservatoire in each of the Regions of France. The new Orchestre de Paris was also built on the model intended to be followed by planned regional orchestras. In this endeavour Landowski worked with local authorities, especially those in the regional centres such as Bordeaux, Lille, Lyon, Strasbourg and Toulouse, who signed agreements under which the French State would finance a third of each company or ensemble's operating budget. Landowski also oversaw modernisation of regional concert halls and theatres.

In 1975 Landowski was appointed Inspector General of Music, and was Director of Cultural Affairs of the City of Paris from 1977 to 1979. He succeeded Emmanuel Bondeville as President of the Maurice Ravel Foundation and was in turn succeeded by Manuel Rosenthal.

He died in hospital in Paris in 1999, aged 84.

Compositions
Landowski eschewed the avant-garde approaches to music of his contemporaries, preferring a more conservative style. His greatest musical influence was Arthur Honegger. His entire output includes five symphonies, several concertos (notably two for piano and one each for bassoon, for cello, for flute, for trumpet, for trombone, for violin), operas as well as a Mass and bears testimony to Honegger's impact. Landowski went on to write a biography of his mentor.

Selected works
1940  Piano Concerto No. 1
1949  Symphony No. 1, "Jean de la Peur"
1954  Concerto for ondes Martenot and string orchestra.
1956  Le Fou (opera)
1962   Les Notes du Nuit (symphonic poem)
1963   Piano Concerto No. 2
1963   Symphony No. 2
1964   Symphony No. 3, "Des Espaces"
1968   Flute Concerto
1976   Trumpet Concerto, "Au bout du chagrin, une fenêtre ouverte"
1977   Messe de l'Aurore, oratorio on a poem by Pierre Emmanuel
1979   Un enfant apelle (concerto composed for the cellist Mstislav Rostropovich and his wife, soprano Galina Vishnevskaya).
1982   L'Horloge, symphonic poem.
1987   La Vieille Maison, "musical tale" in 2 acts
1988   Symphony No. 4
1998   Symphony No. 5, "Les Lumières de la nuit"

Many of his works were recorded by Erato Records who issued a retrospective of his recordings in 2010.

Selected filmography
Between the 1940s and the 1960s, Landowski composed the scores for several dozen films, most notably Gigi (1949).
 Mandrin (1947)
 Dark Sunday (1948)
 The Woman I Murdered (1948)
 The Secret of Monte Cristo (1948)
 Street Without a King (1950)
 Mammy (1951)
 The Passerby (1951)
 Maria of the End of the World (1951)

References

External links 
 Catalogue of works (in French and English)(.pdf file)
 

1915 births
1999 deaths
French film score composers
French male film score composers
French people of Polish descent
People from Pont-l'Abbé
Conservatoire de Paris alumni
20th-century French composers
French opera composers
20th-century French male musicians